Trinity Church is a historic church building in Mason, Tennessee, United States. The congregation was established by Reverend John Chilton in 1834. The original church building was completed in 1870, and designed by James B. Cook in the Gothic Revival architectural style. The connecting parish hall was designed by Wells Awsumb in 1964. The entire structure has been listed on the National Register of Historic Places since March 15, 1984. The church features carved walnut pews.

References

National Register of Historic Places in Tipton County, Tennessee
Gothic Revival architecture in Tennessee
Churches completed in 1870